Lisa Bobbie Schreiber Hughes (born 1958) is a retired career member of the Senior Foreign Service who was the American Ambassador to Suriname from 2006 until 2009.  She had served there as Deputy Chief of Mission from 2000 until 2002.

Schreiber Hughes was the U.S. Consul General in Calgary.

Education
Hughes earned a Master of Science Degree in National Security Strategy at the National War College at National Defense University in Washington, DC, a Juris Doctor from Rutgers Law School and bachelor's degree from Rutgers University in New Jersey.

References

1958 births
Living people
Rutgers University alumni
Rutgers Law School alumni
New Jersey lawyers
United States Foreign Service personnel
National War College alumni
American consuls
American women ambassadors
Ambassadors of the United States to Suriname
21st-century American women